Cephas of Iconium is numbered among the Seventy Disciples, and was bishop of Iconium or Colophon, Pamphylia. The name "Cephas" is Aramaic for "Peter."

The Eastern Orthodox Church remembers St. Cephas on March 30 with Apostles Sosthenes, Apollos, Caesar, and Epaphroditus; and on December 8 with the same apostles and Onesiphorus.  Apostles of the 70 were hand-picked (chosen) and sent by Jesus himself to preach. They were chosen some time after the selection of the Twelve Apostles.  All seventy are commemorated by the Orthodox Church on January 4.

References

External links
Apostle Cephas of the Seventy, March 30 (OCA)
Apostle Cephas of the Seventy, December 8 (OCA)
The Holy Apostles Sosthenes, Apollos, Tychicus, Epaphroditus, Onesiphorus, Cephas and Caesar (Prologue of Ohrid)
The Choosing Of The Seventy Holy Apostles

References

Eastern Orthodox bishops of Iconium
Seventy disciples
1st-century bishops in Roman Anatolia